Mohamed Habib Bel Hadj (born 27 November 1972) is a Tunisian middle-distance runner. He competed in the men's 800 metres at the 2000 Summer Olympics.

References

1972 births
Living people
Athletes (track and field) at the 2000 Summer Olympics
Tunisian male middle-distance runners
Olympic athletes of Tunisia
Place of birth missing (living people)
20th-century Tunisian people